Poppin' Fresh, more widely known as the Pillsbury Doughboy, is an advertising mascot for the Pillsbury Company, appearing in many of their commercials. Many commercials from 1965 until 2005 (together with some for GEICO between 2009 and 2017) ended with a human finger poking the Doughboy's belly. The Doughboy responds by giggling when his belly is poked. (Hoo-Hoo!, or earlier on, a slight giggle "tee hee").

History 

The Pillsbury Doughboy was created by Rudolph 'Rudy' Perz, a copywriter for Pillsbury's longtime advertising agency Leo Burnett. Perz was sitting in his kitchen in the spring of 1965, under pressure to create an advertising campaign for the Pillsbury's refrigerated dough product line (biscuits, dinner rolls, sweet rolls, and cookies). His copywriter, Carol H. Williams, imagined a living doughboy popping out of a Pillsbury refrigerated dough can and wrote the campaign, "Say Hello to Poppin' Fresh Dough". Williams was inducted into the American Advertising Federation Hall of Fame in 2017.

Character 
Originally named "Jonathan Pillsbury", the dough boy was given a scarf, a chef's hat, and two big blue eyes to distinguish him from the rolls, as well as a blush and a soft, warm chuckle when poked on the belly. The Doughboy was originally designed by Milt Schaffer and brought to life using stop motion clay animation. Today, CGI is used. The first CGI commercial was broadcast in 1992 and was directed by Tim Johnson who at that time was working for PDI, which would be later owned by DreamWorks Animation in 1995.

Animation 
Perz originally conceived the Doughboy as an animated figure but changed his mind after seeing a stop motion titling technique used in the opening credits for The Dinah Shore Show. A three-dimensional Doughboy puppet was then created at a cost of $16,000. Voice actor Paul Frees was chosen to be Fresh's voice. Stop-motion animator George Pal was hired to animate him. The first Poppin' Fresh commercials aired in November 1965. Since then, Pillsbury has used Poppin' Fresh in more than 600 commercials for more than fifty of its products. He also appeared in a MasterCard's "Icons" commercial in 2005 during Super Bowl XXXIX, with the Jolly Green Giant, the Morton Salt Girl, the Vlasic stork, Charlie the Tuna, Mr. Peanut, Count Chocula, the Gorton's Fisherman, Chef Boyardee, and Mr. Clean as some of the ten merchandising icons, depicted as having dinner together. He even appears in ads for the Got Milk? company and the Sprint Phone Company, and the GEICO insurance company. He also made a cameo appearance in the 1987 claymation film The Puppetoon Movie.

After Frees' death in 1986, Jeff Bergman took over the role, until 2013. Today, the high-pitched giggles are done by JoBe Cerny. In two adverts for the UK in 1976 however, British voice actor Peter Hawkins voiced the character.

Beginning in 1992, the animation for the doughboy was changed from stop-motion animation to CGI animation. And to this day, he continues to be CGI animated in any new ads.

Pillsbury family
In the 1970s, a Pillsbury Doughboy family was created and sold as dolls individually and in the form of various playsets.

Included in the family are:
Poppin' Fresh
Poppie Fresh (a.k.a. Mrs. Poppin' Fresh, Pillsbury Doughgirl). It is debated among collectors as to whether Poppie is Poppin's wife, girlfriend, or sister.
Granpopper and Granmommer (grandparents)
Popper (boy) and Bun-Bun (baby, girl)
Flapjack (dog) and Biscuit (cat)
Uncle Rollie

Trademark conflict
In May 2010, Pillsbury's lawyers served a cease and desist notice to My Dough Girl, LLC., a Salt Lake City, Utah cookie retailer. Some reported that an attorney for General Mills instructed her not to talk to the press.

References

External links
Audio file (MP3 format) of the Doughboy giggling 
Character's official site 
Official history of Poppin' Fresh from General Mills website
Pillsbury Family

Corporate mascots
Fictional characters from Minnesota
Fictional chefs
Fictional food characters
Fictional humanoids
Male characters in advertising
Food advertising characters
Mascots introduced in 1965